Scythris eburnipterella is a moth of the family Scythrididae. It was described by Bengt Å. Bengtsson in 2014. It is found in South Africa and Namibia.

References

eburnipterella
Moths described in 2014